Akira Psycho Ball (アキラ・サイコ・ボール, Akira Saiko Bōru) is a 2002 digital pinball game based on the popular Akira series created by Katsuhiro Otomo. It features the original storyline and a soundtrack inspired by that of the film.

The game was released on the Japanese market to coincide with the release of the newly remastered DVD Japanese edition.

In 2003, the game was translated by Bandai's European division, and distributed in Europe by Infogrames.

Fields
The pinball is made of four stages inspired by the movie: Neo Tokyo battlefield, the "A-room", the "Olympic Stadium" and the "Laboratory" transformation.

When the player succeeds, like getting an extra ball or clearing a stage, a short clip taken from the movie is displayed on screen.

Reception
On release, Famitsu magazine scored the game a 31 out of 40.

References

External links
 - use your mouse's drag & drop function to move the items toward the arrows

2002 video games
Bandai games
KAZe games
Pinball video games
PlayStation 2 games
PlayStation 2-only games
Video games about psychic powers
Video games based on anime and manga
Video games developed in Japan
Multiplayer and single-player video games
Akira (franchise)

ja:AKIRA PSYCHO BALL